The Choco Mucho Flying Titans is a professional women's volleyball team playing in the Premier Volleyball League. The team is owned by the Republic Biscuit Corporation.

History 
The team was created by the Republic Biscuit Corporation for the 2019 Premier Volleyball League season acquiring the seniors of the 2019 Ateneo Lady Eagles volleyball team together with their coach, Oliver Almadro who won UAAP Season 81 volleyball tournaments. Madayag, De Leon, Tolentino and Gequiliana were joined by the players of the disbanding United Volleyball Club from the Philippine Super Liga. The team was triumphant for their debut as they swept BaliPure Purest Water Defenders in their first game for the 2019 Premier Volleyball League Open Conference last August 14, 2019. They were seventh, winning 6 games out of 16. The team, led by Madayag, had a 6-game winning streak  for the comeback in the 2021 Premier Volleyball League Open Conference. They defeated the PLDT High Speed Hitters, Santa Lucia Realtors, BaliPure Purest Water Defenders, Cignal HD Spikers, Perlas Spikers, and Philippine Army Lady Troopers in the eliminations giving away only two sets. They only lost twice in the eliminations to Creamline Cool Smashers and Chery Tiggo 7 Pro Crossovers, whom they faced off in the Semi-Finals. They ranked fourth in the 2021 Premier Volleyball League Open Conference after losing to Petro Gazz Angels in the battle for bronze.

Current roster 

Coaching staff
 Head coach: Dante Alinsunurin
 Assistant coaches: Edjet Mabbayad 
 Jessie Lopez
 Conditioning Coach: Angelino de Leon

Team Staff
 Team Coordinator: Kris Alcantara
 Trainer: Timothy Santo Tomas
 Statistician:  Ramona Jessica Bagatsing
Medical Staff
 Physical Therapist: Bethel Solano

Legend
 Team Captain
 Outside Hitter
 Opposite Hitter
 Setter
 Libero
 Middle Blocker
 Import
 Draft Pick
 Rookie
 Inactive
 Suspended
 Free Agent

Previous roster

Legend
  Team Captain
  Outside Hitter
  Opposite Hitter
  Setter
  Libero
  Middle Blocker
  Import
  Draft Pick
  Rookie
  Inactive
  Suspended
  Free Agent

2022 PVL Season

2022 Premier Volleyball League Reinforced Conference

Coaching staff
 Head coach:  Oliver Almadro
 Assistant coach:  Edjet Mabbayad
 Conditioning Coach:  Angelino de Leon

Team Staff
 Team Coordinator:  Kris Alcantara
 Trainer:  Timothy Santo Tomas
 Statistician:   Ramona Jessica Bagatsing
Medical Staff
 Physical Therapist:  Bethel Solano

2022 Premier Volleyball League Invitational Conference

Coaching staff
 Head coach:  Oliver Almadro
 Assistant coach:  Edjet Mabbayad
 Conditioning Coach:  Angelino de Leon

Team Staff
 Team Coordinator:  Kris Alcantara
 Trainer:  Timothy Santo Tomas
 Statistician:   Ramona Jessica Bagatsing
Medical Staff
 Physical Therapist:  Bethel Solano

2022 Premier Volleyball League Open Conference

Coaching staff
 Head coach:  Oliver Almadro
 Assistant coach:  Edjet Mabbayad
 Conditioning Coach:  Angelino de Leon

Team Staff
 Team Coordinator:  Kris Alcantara
 Trainer:  Timothy Santo Tomas
 Statistician:   Ramona Jessica Bagatsing
Medical Staff
 Physical Therapist:  Bethel Solano

2021 PVL Season

Coaching staff
 Head coach: Oliver Almadro
 Assistant coach: Edjet Mabbayad
 Conditioning Coach: Angelino de Leon

Team Staff
 Team Coordinator: Kris Alcantara
 Trainer: Timothy Santo Tomas
 Statistician: Ramona Jessica Bagatsing
Medical Staff
 Physical Therapist: Bethel Solano

2019 PVL Season

Coaching staff
 Head coach:  Oliver Almadro
 Assistant coach:  Timothy Santo Tomas
 Conditioning Coach:  Miguel Aytona

Team Staff
 Team Coordinator:  Kris Alcantara
 Trainer:  JP Pareja
 Statistician:   Ramona Jessica Bagatsing
Medical Staff
 Physical Therapist:  Bethel Solano

Honors

Team

Individual

Coaches 
 Oliver Almadro (2019–2022)
 Edjet Mabbayad (2022)
 Dante Alinsunurin (2023–present)

Team captains 
  Maddie Madayag (2019 – 2021)
  Bea de Leon (2022 – present)

Imports

Former players

Local players

 Mary Grace Masangkay 
 Mary Grace Berte 
 Cindy Imbo 
 Carla Sandoval 
 Shiela Marie Pineda
 Arianna May Angustia 
 Gyra Ezra Barroga
 Mary Jane Diane Ticar 
 Dancel Dusaran 
 Erika Gel Alkuino 
 Kassandra Marie Gequillana 
 Manilla Santos-Ng 
 Necole Ebuen
 Jamie Lavitoria
 Pauline Gaston
 Shannen Palec 

Foreign players

 Odina Aliyeva

Notes

References 

2019 establishments in the Philippines
Women's volleyball teams in the Philippines